Luca Giurato (born 23 December 1939 in Rome) is an Italian journalist and presenter. He worked for La Stampa and he was vice-director of the TG1 until 1990.

References

1939 births
Living people
Italian journalists
Italian male journalists